Stanić Rijeka (Cyrillic: Станић Ријека) is a village in the municipalities of Doboj (Republika Srpska) and Doboj East, Bosnia and Herzegovina.

Demographics 
According to the 2013 census, its population was 1,756, with 1,055 of them living in the Doboj municipality, and 701 in the Doboj East part.

References

Villages in Republika Srpska
Populated places in Doboj
Populated places in Doboj Istok